Oru Kadhal Seiveer is a 2006 Indian Tamil language romantic thriller film directed by Ravi Bhargavan. The film stars Santhosh, Archana Galrani and Krishna, with Chandrasekhar, Sabitha Anand, Ilavarasu, Jothisha, Meenakshi, Sundari and Kantharaj playing supporting roles. It was released on 10 March 2006.

Plot
Kamesh (Santhosh), a playboy, meets the modern and practical girl Subha (Archana Galrani). Subha wants a non-committed relationship, and the two start to hang out, and they even have sex one day. Kamesh slowly falls in love with Subha and wants to settle down in life, so he asks her to marry him, but she declines. Thereafter, Subha agrees for an arranged marriage with the engineer Anand (Krishna) who is also Kamesh's best friend.

The young couple moves to Ooty. Kamesh is still obsessed with Subha and wants to have sex with her one more time, so he arrives in Ooty and stays at their home. Kamesh starts to lust for her, but she refuses to cheat on her kindhearted husband. Kamesh then tortures her mentally for sleeping with her, and Subha eventually accepts and brings him to a hotel. There, she gives an interview for the journalists she has invited, and Kamesh is dazed. Subha tells them that she had premarital sex with someone and he is now torturing her. She then takes a knife and stabs Kamesh to death. Subha is arrested for the murder and is sentenced to five years in prison. The film ends with Anand comforting his wife in jail and swearing that he will wait for her.

Cast

Santhosh as Kamesh
Archana Galrani as Subha
Krishna as Anand
Chandrasekhar as Vijayakanthan, Subha's father
Sabitha Anand as Sagunthala, Subha's mother
Ilavarasu as Aadhi
Jothisha as Jothi
Meenakshi as Meenakshi
Sundari as Mallika Devi, Anand's mother
Kantharaj as Ramalingam, Anand's father
Prathiba
Selvakumar
Amirtha Ganesh
Samar
Risha in a special appearance

Production
Ravi Bhargavan, who had directed films such as Well Done (2003) and Kadhal Seiya Virumbu (2005), returned with Oru Kadhal Seiveer under the banner of Selvi Productions. Santhosh who was also the hero of Ravi Bhargavan's earlier film Kadhal Seiya Virumbu teamed up again with the director. Newcomer Archana Galrani, who was studying eleventh grade at that time, had been signed as the female lead. Krishna, known for playing the lead role in the TV serial Chidambara Rahasiyam, was chosen to play a significant role.

Soundtrack

The film score and the soundtrack were composed by Bharani. The soundtrack features 5 tracks.

Reception
S. R. Ashok Kumar of The Hindu said, "Oru Kadhal Seiveer is a film with a message that has not been conveyed very well. The climax is a let down thus diluting the story". Malini Mannath wrote, "Santhosh reveals more maturity in his second film, and is more comfortable and confident here. Archana suits the role, acquits herself fairly creditably, but needs to work more on her expression" and concluded, "It's a film with a message, but could have done with more finesse". Another reviewer praised Santosh's acting but criticised the heroine's acting, the first half of the film and the double meaning dialogues.

References

2006 films
2000s Tamil-language films
2000s romantic thriller films
Indian romantic thriller films